The 1979 State of the Union address was given by President Jimmy Carter to a joint session of the 96th United States Congress on January 23, 1979.

The speech lasted 32 minutes and 32 seconds. and contained 3257 words.

The Republican Party response was delivered by Senator Howard Baker Jr. (TN) and Representative John Rhodes (AZ).

References

External links
 (full transcript), The American Presidency Project, UC Santa Barbara.
 1979 State of the Union Address (full video and audio at www.millercenter.org)

State of the Union addresses
Presidency of Jimmy Carter
Speeches by Jimmy Carter
96th United States Congress
State of the Union Address
State of the Union Address
State of the Union Address
State of the Union Address
January 1979 events in the United States